Stemmatophora syriacalis is a species of snout moth in the genus Stemmatophora. It was described by Émile Louis Ragonot in 1895. It is found in France, Spain and Algeria.

Species
Stemmatophora syriacalis syriacalis
Stemmatophora syriacalis oranalis Zerny, 1914 (Algeria, France and Spain)

References

Moths described in 1895
Pyralini
Moths of Europe
Moths of Africa